Portrait of Massimiliano II Stampa is a c.1558 oil on canvas painting by Sofonisba Anguissola, now in the Walters Art Museum, Baltimore, USA. It was previously misattributed to Giovan Battista Moroni, possibly due to stylistic similarities with Moroni's The Knight in Black.

One of Anguissola's most important commissions, it shows Massimiliano II Stampa, 3rd Marquess of Soncino, then aged around nine. The Stampa family commissioned the portrait to commemorate Massimiliano's inheritance of the title on the death of his father in 1557.

His dress is clearly influenced by the Spanish dominance of Lombardy at that time and the painting's style is also influenced by Spanish portraitists of the time, such as its aristocratically cold pose and allegorical symbols of wealth and social success.

References

1558 paintings
Massimiliano II Stampa
Paintings in the collection of the Walters Art Museum
Paintings of children